Millbury may refer to:

 Millbury, Massachusetts
 Millbury High School
 Millbury, Ohio